A smokestack industry is a basic, usually cyclical, manufacturing industry. The factories stereotypically used in such industries that have flue gas stacks, hence the name, and produce a high volume of pollution. During the earliest era of electric power development, coal fired electric stations in urban areas were common prior to the use of Alternating current for lighting as Direct current electricity could only travel short distances.

Example industries include:
Iron and steelworks
Automotive industry
Chemical industry
Electric industry

Smokestacks are large industrial chimneys used in the process of combusting mostly fossil fuels in furnaces with the goal of producing steam to drive generators for electricity, for the smelting ores, or as a separation or refinery process.  The carefully constructed circular stacks were used to both increase the flow of combustible air but also isolate exhaust gases, carbon dioxide and pollutants from ground level releases during ever larger industrial activities.  The difference in temperature between the bottom inside and outside of the stack helped to increase the rate air flow through the furnace known as the stack effect.

History
Smokestacks were first used during industrial revolution between the 18th century and 19th centuries and were known to foul the airs in most larger cities but were most noted in large industrial centers like Manchester England or Pittsburgh Pennsylvania.  During the dramatic growth and evolution of systems used to produce electricity coal burning central electric stations that relied on direct current were found throughout cities that released noxious fumes and soot into the city air. Taller smokestacks helped to reduce this environmental issue.  During the 20th century fans were used to increase air currents needed in furnaces while heights that reached 1,300 feet grew as a way to comply with environmental safety regulations passed by governments.

External links
 European Union: Global sources of air pollution by country

References

Manufacturing